Us Two is a 1979 drama film written, directed and produced by Claude Lelouch. It was screened out of competition at the 1979 Cannes Film Festival.

Cast
 Catherine Deneuve as Françoise
 Jacques Dutronc as Simon Lacassaigne
 Jacques Villeret as Tonton Musique
 Paul Préboist as Mimile
 Bernard Le Coq as photographer (as Bernard Lecoq)
 Gilberte Géniat as Zézette
 Jacques Godin as Major Strauss
 Monique Mélinand as Françoise's mother
 Émile Genest as American chief of police
 Jean-François Rémi as Françoise's father
 Bernard Crombey as Alain (as Bernard Crommbey)
 Daniel Auteuil as thug
 John Boylan as highway patrol

References

External links
 
 
 

1979 films
1979 drama films
1970s Canadian films
1970s French films
1970s French-language films
Canadian drama films
Films about couples
Films directed by Claude Lelouch
Films set in Canada
Films set in France
Films set in the United States
French drama films
French-language Canadian films